Vivilian Richards Johnkumar is an Indian politician. He was elected to the Puducherry Legislative Assembly from Nellithope as a member of the Bharatiya Janata Party. He defeated V. Karthikeyan of Dravida Munnetra Kazhagam by 496 votes in 2021 Puducherry Assembly election.

References 

Bharatiya Janata Party politicians from Puducherry
Puducherry MLAs 2021–2026
Puducherry politicians
Living people
Year of birth missing (living people)
21st-century Indian politicians
People from Puducherry